Relations between people in Hong Kong and mainland China have been relatively tense since the early 2000s. Various factors have contributed, including different interpretations of the "one country, two systems" principle; policies of the Hong Kong and central governments to encourage mainland visitors to Hong Kong; and the changing economic environment. More broadly, there exists resentment toward mainland-Hong Kong convergence and assimilation, as well as the increasing interference from the government of China and its ruling Chinese Communist Party (CCP) in Hong Kong's internal affairs.

Background

Hong Kong was originally ruled by China up to the Qing dynasty in 1842 when the Treaty of Nanking ceded the island to the British Empire and later expanded to include the Kowloon Peninsula in 1860 after the Second Opium War and later by the Convention for the Extension of Hong Kong Territory in 1898 to lease the New Territories. From 1941 to 1945, it was occupied by the Japanese Empire.

In 1972, after the change of the Chinese seat in the United Nations, the People's Republic of China, established in 1949 after the lengthy civil war, demanded that Hong Kong be removed from the United Nations list of non-self-governing territories, thus depriving Hong Kong of its right to independence. The Sino-British Joint Declaration of December 1984 laid out the terms for the transfer of sovereignty of Hong Kong from the United Kingdom to the PRC, which concluded with a special handover ceremony on 1 July 1997.

The terms agreed between the governments for the transfer included a series of guarantees for the maintenance of Hong Kong's differing economic, political and legal systems after the transfer, and the further development of Hong Kong's political system with a goal of democratic government. These guarantees were set out in the Sino-British Joint Declaration and enshrined in the semi-constitutional Basic Law of Hong Kong. Initially, many Hong Kongers were enthusiastic about Hong Kong's return to China.

However, tension has arisen between Hong Kong residents and the mainland, and in particular the central government, since 1997, and especially in the late 2000s and early 2010s. Controversial policies such as the Individual Visit Scheme and the Guangzhou–Shenzhen–Hong Kong Express Rail Link have been seized on as focal points of discontent. Some (2011) argue that since the Hong Kong government failed to force through the legislation to implement Article 23 of the Basic Law, Beijing's relatively hands-off approach to Hong Kong changed dramatically. This view holds that the PRC's strategy is aimed at trying to dissolve the boundary between Hong Kong and the rest of China. Some representatives of the government of mainland China have adopted increasingly strong rhetoric attacking Hong Kong's political and legal systems. More formally, the Central People's Government released a report in 2014 that asserts that Hong Kong's judiciary should be subordinate to, and not independent of, the government. The Basic Law and the Sino-British Joint Declaration guarantee the development of Hong Kong's electoral system towards universal suffrage, but the more pro-democracy parts of the Legislative Council rejected incremental progress. By the time the central government stepped in with a view, the so-called Pan-Democrats had adopted an all-or-nothing strategy that derailed any hope of progress in time for elections in 2008–2018.

Hong Kong is a multi-ethnic society with British-influenced values in relation to race, languages and cultures compared to those held by the Chinese government and many mainland residents. As a highly developed economy with a high standard of living, Hong Kong culture has different values in relation to hygiene and social propriety compared to mainland China, and Hongkongers have been upset by misbehaviour from mainlanders, such as spitting in public and eating on the subway. The cultural and economic differences are widely considered as a primary cause of the conflict between Hong Kong and mainland China. The differences between Hong Kong people and mainlanders, such as language, as well as the significant growth in number of mainland visitors, have caused tension. Since the implementation of Individual Visit Scheme on 28 July 2003, the number of mainland visitors increased from 6.83 million in 2002 to 40.7 million in 2013, according to the statistics provided by the Hong Kong Tourism Board. The conflict relates to issues regarding the allocation of resources between mainlanders and Hong Kong people in different sectors, such as healthcare and education.

Incidents

Dolce & Gabbana controversy 

On 5 January 2012, Apple Daily reported that only Hong Kong citizens had been prevented from taking pictures of Dolce & Gabbana window displays in both their Hong Kong fashion outlets, stirring anti-mainlander sentiment. In particular staff and security personnel at their flagship store on Canton Road asserted the pavement area outside was private property where photography was forbidden. The actions sparked protests spanning several days and gained international news coverage on the 8th of January. Citing the case of Zhou Jiugeng (周久耕), a Nanjing official whose high-living lifestyle was identified by Chinese citizens using internet photographs, local news reports speculated that the Dolce & Gabbana photo ban may have been imposed at the request of some wealthy Chinese government officials who were shopping and who feared photographs of them in the store might circulate and fuel corruption allegations and investigations into the source of their wealth.

Kong Qingdong calling Hong Kongers "old dogs"

In early 2012, Kong Qingdong, a Peking University professor, publicly called Hong Kongers "old dogs" in the aftermath of a controversy over a mainland Chinese child eating on the subway in Hong Kong. Kong's strong language prompted protests in Hong Kong.

Parallel business in Hong Kong

Since 2012, there has been an increase in mainland parallel traders coming to the northern parts of Hong Kong to import goods and export them back to mainland. Products that are popular among these traders include infant formula and household products. As a result of shortages of milk powder in Hong Kong for an extended time, the government imposed restrictions on the amount of milk powder exports from Hong Kong. With effect from 1 March 2013, each person is only allowed 2 cans, or 1.8 kg of milk powder per trip in the MTR and cross-borders. Besides, since northern places like Sheung Shui became the transaction centres of the traders, this resulted in discontent from nearby residents.

Anchor babies in Hong Kong

Until 2012, the number of anchor babies in Hong Kong had been increasing. Pregnant mainland women were seeking to give birth in Hong Kong, specifically to benefit from the right of abode and thereby the ability to enjoy social welfare in the city. Hong Kong citizens expressed concerns that the pregnant women and anchor babies put a heavier burden on Hong Kong's medical system. Some of them even called mainlanders "locusts" for taking away Hong Kong's resources from locals. Over 170,000 new births where both parents were mainlanders occurred between 2001 and 2011, of which 32,653 births were in 2010. CY Leung's first public announcement on policy as Chief Executive-elect was to impose a 'zero' quota on mainland mothers giving birth in Hong Kong. Leung further underlined that those who did may not be able to secure the right of abode for their offspring in Hong Kong. Many of these anchor babies cross the border to attend school; there are approximately 28,000 daily cross-border pupils who attend school in Hong Kong but live in mainland China.

Racial abuse of Hong Kong football team

In 2015, the Chinese Football Association launched a series of posters relating to other Asian football teams. Among these, a poster appeared to mock the ethnic make-up of Hong Kong's football team with the words: “Do not underestimate the opponent. This is a team with black-, yellow- and white-skinned players, a diverse team that we must prepare for.” In response, in subsequent matches between Hong Kong and Bhutan and the Maldives respectively, supporters of the Hong Kong team jeered when the Chinese national anthem was played for the Hong Kong team.

In April 2017, during a match in Hong Kong between Hong Kong club Eastern SC and Chinese club Guangzhou Evergrande, Guangzhou Evergrande fans displayed an "Annihilate British Dogs, Eradicate Hong Kong Independence Poison" banner during the game. This resulted in them being fined US$22,500.

Siu Yau-wai case
In July 2015, localists including Hong Kong Indigenous and Youngspiration marched to the Immigration Department to demand deportation of an undocumented 12-year-old Mainland boy Siu Yau-wai, who lived in Hong Kong for nine years without identification. Siu, whose parents are alive and well in mainland China, stayed with his grandparents after having overstayed his two-way permit nine years ago. Pro-Beijing Federation of Trade Unions lawmaker Chan Yuen-han advised and assisted the boy and his grandmother to obtain a temporary ID and pleaded for compassion from the local community. Some called on the authorities to consider the case on a humanitarian basis and grant Siu permanent citizenship while many others, afraid that the case would open the floodgates to appeals from other illegal immigrants, asked for the boy to be repatriated. The boy eventually gave up and returned to his parents in mainland China, buckling to immense pressure by localists.

Anti-mainlandisation motion

On 19 November 2015, an anti-mainlandisation motion was introduced in the Legislative Council by lawmaker Claudia Mo, but it was voted down with 19 in favour and 34 opposing. The motion sought to defend local history and culture from the influence of mainland China. Supporters argued that mainlandisation would lead to more counterfeit and fake products, rampant corruption and the abuse of power, while Hong Kong risked becoming another mainland city. Opponents of the motion argued that the motion was seeing different cultures with a narrow perspective, and intended to split the Chinese nation and create conflict.

CUHK democracy wall tensions

In September 2017, tensions arose between Mainland students, Hong Kong students, CUHK staff and CUHK student union staff members over the content of posters/banners put up on the 'Democracy wall' in the Chinese University of Hong Kong. With issues of vandalism, disobeying the rules, freedom of speech, respecting different opinions and displaying hateful messages reaching the spotlight, as well similar incidents occurring in other Hong Kong universities' 'Democracy walls' such as those of Education University of Hong Kong, University of Hong Kong, and Hong Kong Polytechnic University, this also reignited the Hong Kong Independence debate within Hong Kong society.

2019–2020 Hong Kong protests

Several mass protests took place during mid 2019 against a proposed extradition bill allowing dissidents to be arbitrarily transferred to mainland China, including a march claimed by organisers to have included two million people, a quarter of Hong Kong's population, on 16 June. Throughout the summer and autumn, clashes between police and protesters occurred. Tolerance for differing opinions on the protests reportedly decreased in Hong Kong. Due to the outbreak of the COVID-19 pandemic, mass protests were suspended from early February 2020. The resurgence of protests after the easing of the pandemic was brief, due to the national security law. Sporadic protests still took place afterwards, in spite of the draconian nature of the law.

Property acquisition by the Chinese government 

The Central People's Government (CPG) has acquired property in Hong Kong with controversy.

The PLA Hong Kong Garrison's plans for the Central Military Dock have been contested by lawmakers, and the radar station at Tai Mo Shan was secretly opened, against the Garrison Law, which states that "the locations and boundaries of the military restricted zones shall be declared by the government." In addition, a Reuters article has shown that many of the military sites are underused and could be returned to public use.

The Liaison Office has also purchased significant residential housing through its private subsidiary, Newman Investment, and has escaped paying stamp duties, even though Newman Investment is not registered as an organisation that serves the public. This means that public taxpayer money has essentially subsidised purchases of housing on behalf of the Liaison Office, and less housing is available for normal citizens.

Abductions of people in Hong Kong by Chinese authorities 

Mainland authorities have made multiple attempts to abduct people in Hong Kong to bring them to the mainland, starting in 2015.

On 26 May 2015, Gu Zhuoheng, owner of Sing Pao Daily News, was almost abducted by mainland authorities after landing at Hong Kong International Airport. While at the Regal Hotel, Gu said that more than 20 mainland authorities with firearms attempted to extradite him to the mainland; Gu resisted until hotel security guards called airport police to assist him. Hong Kong police confirmed the incident and then released the suspects due to "insufficient evidence."

Lee Bo, a staff member of Causeway Bay Books, was abducted several months later in December 2015 and brought to Shenzhen. The Hong Kong Immigration Department has no record of Lee having left Hong Kong, meaning he was brought across the border without going through normal border control.

In another incident about a year later in January 2017, Xiao Jianhua, a businessman, was abducted from the Four Seasons Hotel in Hong Kong and brought to the mainland.

Porous borders and smuggling 
Hong Kong is a free port and has no customs tariff on imported goods, while mainland China does, offering smugglers an opportunity to take advantage of price differences. Smugglers use speedboats to illegally bring goods from Hong Kong to mainland China without paying tariffs, including meat and ginseng. Those arrested have included both Hong Kong and mainland Chinese citizens.

In 2019, a total of 1,050 tonnes of contraband was seized by customs officers. For the first six months of 2020, 2,500 tonnes of frozen meat were seized. In January 2020, three Hong Kong customs officers were killed when their boat capsized during an anti-smuggling operation. A cargo vessel, believed to have collided with the officers' boat, was found later with 1000 boxes of frozen meat, destined for mainland China.

Smugglers have also used land-based vehicles to smuggle goods in Sha Tau Kok, a village in northeastern Hong Kong. Additionally, Sha Tau Kok has a porous and blurry border through Chung Ying Street, where residents with a Frontier Closed Area permit can cross between Hong Kong and mainland China without going through normal border control. In March 2020, it was discovered that even though the Hong Kong government implemented a rule that those entering Hong Kong from mainland China must quarantine for 14 days to prevent the spread of COVID-19, those entering Hong Kong from mainland China through Sha Tau Kok were exempted from quarantine measures.

HKU Student Union video 

On 1 September 2020, HKU Student Union's CampusTV released a "parody video" welcoming the new mainland Chinese students to HKU, which contained certain negative references to recent events. On 2 September, the university management of HKU condemned the video as bullying and hate speech towards mainland Chinese. On 3 September, CampusTV removed the video and apologised for "the inaccurate use of words and the misunderstanding caused", stating it did not mean to target anyone, but merely to point out the failings of the university management to the HKU students (through a parody video).

Catholicism 
In October 2021, the Liaison Office met senior Hong Kong Catholic clergymen and briefed them on Xi Jinping's views on the "Sinicization" of religion, or the adoption of "Chinese characteristics" within established religions.

In May 2022, retired Cardinal Joseph Zen was arrested by the national security police. German Cardinal Gerhard Mueller said that Zen was being sacrificed to please Beijing, stating "This cardinal will be sacrificed on the altar of reason, to defend and implement the diplomatic agreement with Beijing. I foresee this risk and I feel pain."

In July 2022, the Vatican's unofficial representative in Hong Kong, monsignor Javier Herrera-Corona, warned that religious freedoms were over in Hong Kong due to pressure from mainland Chinese authorities, with one person summarizing the monsignor's message as "Hong Kong is not the great Catholic beachhead it was."

Impact

Rise of locals' awareness in self-identity
The major significance is the rise of local awareness in self-identity. With reference to the survey conducted by a public opinion programme of the University of Hong Kong, the identity index of interviewees who regarded themselves as "Chinese" plummeted between the years of 2008–2014, from approximately 7.5 in 2008 to a continuous fluctuation within the range between 6–7. The drop in sense of national identity is believed to be the result of the aforementioned conflicts. The recent conflicts (anchor babies, D&G crisis, and parallel trading) further contributed to the rise of local awareness in self-identity.

Exacerbation of conflicts between local and mainlanders

There are differences in culture and political backgrounds between those from Hong Kong and China. Hong Kong was ruled by the British based on the system of letters patent from the 1850s to 1997, whereas China has been under the control of the Chinese Communist Party from 1949 onwards.

Some Hong Kong people see mainlanders as rude, impolite, and poorly educated. This further leads to locals' nonacceptance of mainlanders, especially when they travel in Hong Kong. Travelers from the mainland are coming in such tremendous numbers that their existence can influence the direction of government's policies. The premise of various protests within the 2010s were related to the issue of the individual visit scheme adversely affecting the daily lives of Hongkongers. On the other hand, some Mainlanders view Hong Kong with suspicion, mistrust and increasing enmity.

Some mainland Chinese students in Hong Kong who initially had a more positive view of the city than of their own mainland hometowns have reported that their attempts at connecting with the locals were difficult due to experiences of hostility and a sense of inferiority.

Emergence of new 'localist' parties

The 2014 Hong Kong protests led to the birth of new political parties. The pan-democrats encourage young people who participated in the Occupy movement to register and vote in the district council poll. The first wave of dilettantes, about 50 in number, many of whom were millennials having political aspirations and disillusioned with the political establishment, and who were influenced by the Umbrella Revolution, contested the 2015 district council elections. Pitted against seasoned politicians, and with support only from friends and family, they became popularly known as "Umbrella Soldiers".

During the 2016 Hong Kong legislative election, six localist groups which emerged after the 2014 Umbrella Revolution, Youngspiration, Kowloon East Community, Tin Shui Wai New Force, Cheung Sha Wan Community Establishment Power, Tsz Wan Shan Constructive Power and Tuen Mun Community, formed an electoral alliance under the name "ALLinHK" to field candidates in four of the five geographical constituencies with the agenda to put forward a referendum on Hong Kong's self-determination, while Hong Kong Indigenous and another new pro-independence Hong Kong National Party attempted to run in the upcoming election. The student leaders in the Umbrella Revolution, Joshua Wong, Oscar Lai and Agnes Chow of Scholarism and Nathan Law of the Hong Kong Federation of Students (HKFS) formed a new party called Demosistō. The new party calls for referendum on Hong Kong's future after 2047 when the one country, two systems principle is supposed to expire and fielded candidates in Hong Kong Island and Kowloon East.

Changing view of Hong Kong's development of democracy

Due to recent tensions between Mainland and Hong Kong people, along with impact of the Umbrella Movement, different sectors of Hong Kong have shifted their view of Hong Kong's development of democracy.

Traditionally, the pan-democratic camp campaigned for democracy in China and Hong Kong, however after the Umbrella Movement, with the rise of localism, there were calls to make Hong Kong democratic first, then China or only focus on making Hong Kong democratic.
In recent years, localism within Hong Kong, has been gaining popularity of Hong Kong youth, this has led to new political parties and organisations being formed. Some Localist parties have taken the latter view of democracy, while others promote the notion of Hong Kong Independence, believing that only when Hong Kong is independent from Mainland China can real democracy be established.

Likewise, since the end of Umbrella Movement, the pro-Beijing camp as well as Mainland officials, along with CY Leung and Carrie Lam, have said that the development of democracy in Hong Kong is not a top priority and that the Hong Kong government should focus on livelihood issues first.

Signs of mainlandisation of Hong Kong

Since 1997, Hong Kong has been a part of China under the "one country, two systems" approach. Within Hong Kong society, there are different views of this arrangement. Within the political spectrum, the Pro-Beijing camp tends to focus on "one country" aspect, where Hong Kong will gradually integrate into China, while following and supporting the Central government policies as being a guarantee for stability and prosperity in Hong Kong. However, in the Pro-democracy camp, the focus is on the "two systems" approach, where Hong Kong, while acknowledging that it is a part of China and thus has an obligation to cooperate with it, should strive to develop more democratic institutions and preserve freedoms and human rights to achieve prosperity.

Over the years, there have been incidents of mainlandisation within some sectors of society are worried about the changing environment of Hong Kong. Mainlandisation or Integration of Hong Kong is the official policy Beijing government and its Beijing supporters in Hong Kong are actively helping to promote its agenda, using their power to influence certain key decision-making choices within Hong Kong society.

Language policies: promotion of Mandarin

Under the Basic Law of Hong Kong, Chinese and English are the official languages. In reality Mandarin is increasingly given more importance. In recent years, Mandarin has been increasingly used in Hong Kong, this has led to fears of Cantonese being replaced. In May 2018, The Education Bureau of Hong Kong stated that Cantonese is a dialect, thus cannot be considered a mother tongue language. This caused an uproar in Hong Kong, as it was seen as downgrading Cantonese in favour of Mandarin, and as the majority of Hong Kong people speak Cantonese as their first language.

The use of English and its proficiency in Hong Kong has also suffered a decline in standards. The promotion and growth of Mandarin over Cantonese and English in Hong Kong has led to questions being raised by mainlanders about Hong Kong's competitiveness in the global economy, its dependency on the Mainland's economy and its loss of a distinct cultural identity.

Moral and national education controversy

Moral and national education (MNE) is a school curriculum proposed by the Education Bureau of Hong Kong, transformed from the current moral and civic education (MCE). The Hong Kong government attempted to pass the curriculum in 2012, which led to protests. The subject was particularly controversial for praising the :communist and :nationalist ideology of China's government on the one hand, and condemning :democracy and republicanism on the other.

Increasing self-censorship in the media industry

Since 2002, Hong Kong's press freedom has significantly declined. In 2017, Reporters Without Borders, which examines freedom of press in 180 countries and regions, ranked Hong Kong at 73rd in the world, a drop from 18th place in 2002, 34th in 2011, 54th in 2012, 58th in 2013, 61st in 2014, and 70th in 2015. The organisation has China ranked at 176 and Taiwan at 45 – the highest ranking among all Asian countries in 2017.

Hong Kong Journalists Association attributes this to increasing self-censorship within the industry, due to staff members not wanting to upset people in Beijing in fear of retaliation or loss of future opportunities. Jason Y. Ng, writing for the Hong Kong Free Press remarks that, "The post-handover era has witnessed a series of ownership changes in the media industry. Self-censorship can also take the form of personnel changes, including management reshuffling in the newsroom and discontinuation of influential columns."

Integration infrastructure projects

In recent years, there have been many infrastructure projects and policies connecting Hong Kong to mainland China. The pro-democracy camp is suspicious of such projects, arguing that the mainland government is slowly gaining control and influence over Hong Kong, as this integration will eventually turn Hong Kong into another mainland city and make it lose its uniqueness. A focus of criticism is the minimum or lack of consultation from the Hong Kong people regarding these projects or policies, with many regarding them as 'white elephants' of questionable benefit. Another concern is the environmental impact of such projects as well as the high costs, with some projects going far over budget, with the costs being ultimately shouldered by the local taxpayer. However the pro-Beijing camp argues that these projects are to help redevelop Hong Kong, help it maintain its competitiveness and provide new economic opportunities.

List of Integration infrastructure projects:
North East New Territories New Development Areas Planning
Greater Bay Area & Belt and Road Initiative
Hong Kong–Zhuhai–Macau Bridge
Guangzhou–Shenzhen–Hong Kong Express Rail Link Hong Kong section
Lok Ma Chau Loop
Shanghai-Hong Kong Stock Connect & Shenzhen-Hong Kong Stock Connect
Lok Ma Chau Station & Hong Kong–Shenzhen Western Corridor
Hong Kong Palace Museum

One-way permits

Since the handover, the one-way permit scheme, which allows 150 mainlanders a day to come to Hong Kong and Macau to reunite with their families, is administered by Chinese authorities, with Hong Kong and Macau authorities having no say on who can come in. Most of people on this quota end up going to Hong Kong. In recent years this quota has sparked intense debate on the positives, negatives and impacts it has on Hong Kong society. The Beijing government argues that the scheme is to prevent illegal immigration into Hong Kong and Macau.

The Pro-Beijing camp argue that these new immigrants are to help combat an ageing population as well as bringing new talent into the city. The pro-democracy camp, however, sees the one-way permit scheme as a tool for Beijing to gradually change the population mix in Hong Kong and integrate the city with China. A majority of immigrants from the mainland tend to cast their votes in favour of pro-Beijing politicians during elections for district councils and the legislature. Others point out, that too many immigrants are taking away resources from local graduates as there is more competition for jobs and housing. This has led to calls from the pro-democracy camp to change or modify the scheme to allow the Hong Kong government to have a say in choosing which immigrants to come or final approval, while the localist camp advocate cancelling the scheme, saying this preferential treatment has put a strain on resources in Hong Kong and argues that immigrants from the mainland can come and settle in Hong Kong like any other immigrants from around the world.

In at least one year, more than the so-called "maximum" of 150 daily mainlanders were allowed in; 57,387 mainlanders entered Hong Kong in 2017, averaging approximately 157 people per day.

Curtailing academic freedoms

In 2015, The University of Hong Kong governing council rejected the appointment of the recommended candidate Johannes Chan (Dean of the Faculty of Law 2004–2014) to the post of pro-vice-chancellor in charge of staffing and resources. The governing council's decision, the first time that a candidate selected by the committee has been rejected, is widely viewed as political retaliation for Chan's involvement with pro-democratic figures. A majority of HKU Council members are not students or staff of the university, and many were directly appointed by then HKSAR Chief Executive Leung Chun-ying, the majority with Pro-Beijing views. The decision has received international condemnation, and is widely being viewed as part of a Beijing-backed curtailing of academic freedoms that will damage Hong Kong's academic reputation.

Since the end of 2014 Hong Kong protests, professors and lecturers with pro-democracy views or sympathies have experienced media smear campaigns from pro-communist newspapers, harassment from paid Pro-Beijing mobs, cyber-attacks, unrenewed contracts, rejection of jobs or promotions, suffered demotions or blocked from taking senior management positions by university councils, where most members are appointed by the Chief Executive, who are loyal to Beijing.

Undermining judicial independence

The Hong Kong Bar Association has claimed that Beijing has undermined Hong Kong's judicial independence and rule of law through the Standing Committee of the National People's Congress (NPCSC) interpretation of the Hong Kong Basic Law. These controversial interpretations have led to the legal sector of Hong Kong to stage rare silent protests over these interpretations and since 1997 four have been held. It is feared that China wants the Hong Kong's judiciary to become the same format and have the same characteristics as in the mainland.

The first march took place in 1999, when the NPCSC issued the first interpretation of the Basic Law relating to the issue of the right of abode of Chinese citizens with Hong Kong parents. The second was held in 2005 after the NPCSC interpreted a provision in the Hong Kong Basic Law regarding the chief executive's term of office. The third was held in June 2014 over Beijing's issuance of a white paper on the one country, two systems policy, which stated that judges in Hong Kong should be "patriotic" and are "administrators" that are supposed to co-operate with the Executive Branch of Hong Kong, whereas many in Hong Kong believe the Judiciary, Executive and Legislature are independent from each other, as is standard in Western democracies. The fourth march occurred in November 2016, over Hong Kong Legislative Council oath-taking controversy, with over 3000 lawyers and activists parading through Hong Kong in silence and dressed in black.

In late December 2017, in response to the co-location agreement in West Kowloon, the Hong Kong Bar Association issued the following statement: "The current co-location arrangement is in direct contravention of the Basic Law and if implemented would substantially damage the rule of law in Hong Kong. The rule of law will be threatened and undermined if the clear meaning of the Basic Law can be twisted and the provisions of the Basic Law can be interpreted according to expediency and convenience."

Political screening of election candidates 

During the 2014–2015 political reform period, after months of public consultations, the NPCSC issued its decision to allow Hong Kong to have universal suffrage in 2017, with the caveat that candidates would have to be approved by a nominating committee. This triggered the 2014 Hong Kong protests, with many protestors calling it "fake democracy" and political screening that is not genuine universal suffrage. The protests failed to deliver any concessions, but in June 2015 the reform package was voted down by a majority of the legislators, thus showing a lack of popular support for the political reform package.

The 2016 Legco elections, 2017 NPC elections and 2018 Hong Kong by-elections saw potential candidates being disqualified by Returning Officers of the Electoral Affairs Commission who had been given the power to conduct unaccountable political screening. This resulted in the disqualification of six candidates in 2016, 10 in 2017 and a further three in 2018, who were claimed by the Returning Officers to have held "incorrect political views". These elections included a confirmation form where candidates have to accept Article 1 of the Basic Law and swear to uphold the Basic Law. The returning officers believed the candidates were not sincere about complying with Article 1 of the Basic Law (that Hong Kong was an inalienable part of China), thus they were disqualified. This was interpreted by Hong Kong Watch as indicating that there was no fair, open, certain and clear procedure to regulate the process, as the final decision rests on a civil servant's opinion, resulting in arbitrary decisions. In the 2018 Hong Kong by-elections, Agnes Chow was disqualified on the basis that Demosisto's advocacy of "self-determination" after 2047 "could not possibly comply" with Basic Law, despite her fellow party member Nathan Law being allowed to participate and winning a seat in the 2016 Legco elections on exactly the same election platform.

In May 2018, the government announced that support for the Basic Law (particularly Article 1) would be required for all candidates for the upcoming District Council elections in 2019.

National security law 

On 28 May 2020, China's National People's Congress approved the controversial national security laws for Hong Kong, which aim at cracking down protests and ban "any acts or activities" that the communist government considers to endanger China's national security. The critics have called this new legislation a "killer blow" to Hong Kong's autonomy and freedoms. The legislation allows the government's national security agencies to operate in Hong Kong.

National Anthem Ordinance 

In June 2020, a law was passed, making it an offence for those who insult the National Anthem of the People's Republic of China. In addition, the bill goes beyond insulting the anthem, as part 4 of it dictates that primary and secondary education in Hong Kong must incorporate the national anthem in their curriculum, including its singing, history and etiquette regarding it.

Electoral reform 

On 11 March 2021, China's National People's Congress approved the controversial electoral laws for Hong Kong, which aims to ensure a system of "patriots governing Hong Kong". The reforms expanded the number of seats in the Legco and Chief Executive Election Committee, but reduces the number of directly democratically-elected seats. Hong Kong Government officials and pro-establishment figures have hailed the reforms as a way to shut out "anti-China" forces from the political structure whereas the pro-democracy camp in Hong Kong criticised the reforms as a "major regression" in democracy.

References 

Anti-Chinese sentiment in Asia
Localism in Hong Kong
Politics of China
Politics of Hong Kong
Causes of the 2019–2020 Hong Kong protests